The 2014 Post Danmark Rundt was a men's road bicycle race held from 6 August to 10 August 2014. It was the 24th edition of the men's stage race, which was established in 1985. The race was rated as a 2.HC event and formed part of the 2014 UCI Europe Tour. It featured 14 teams, including three UCI ProTeams.

Valgren's team-mate, Italian rider Manuele Boaro, finished in third place, a further two seconds behind. Valgren also won the young riders award as a result of his overall victory.

The points classification was won by Alexey Lutsenko with 31 points, with John Murphy winning the mountains classification.

Teams
A total of 14 teams raced in the 2014 Danmark Rundt: 3 UCI ProTeams, 7 UCI Professional Continental Teams, 3 UCI Continental Teams along with a Danish national team under the Team Post Danmark name.

Denmark (national team)

Route

Stages

Stage 1
6 August 2014 — Hobro to Mariager,

Stage 2
7 August 2014 — Skive to Aarhus,

Stage 3
8 August 2014 — Skanderborg to Vejle,

Stage 4
9 August 2014 — Nyborg to Odense,

Stage 5
9 August 2014 — Middelfart, individual time trial (ITT)

Stage 6
10 August 2014 — Kalundborg to Frederiksberg,

References

External links
 

Danmark Rundt
Danmark Rundt
2014 in Danish sport